Ulisa Diane Buckingham (born 1955) is an African-American psychiatrist known for her development of culturally sensitive diagnosis and treatment of mental illness in children and adolescents.

Working in private practice and teaching at the University of Missouri, Kansas City School of Medicine, Buckingham's research focuses on ADHD, Tourette syndrome and obsessive-compulsive disorder. One of her aims is to challenge, through education, the reluctance of minority parents to allow their children to be evaluated by psychiatrists for fear of having them stigmatized. She is currently clinical assistant professor at the University Of Missouri Kansas City School Of Medicine and in private practice.

Education, awards
Buckingham graduated from the University of Kansas School of Medicine after starting her career as a nurse. In 1991 she received her first major award, the Presidential Scholar Award from the American Academy of Child and Adolescent Psychiatry. Two years later she was awarded the Chester Pierce Residents' Award by the National Medical Association, and in 1994 Black Psychiatrists of America named her Black Outstanding Psychiatric Resident in the Cause of African American Families and Children.

From 2007–2009, Buckingham was chair of the psychiatry section of the National Medical Association. In July 2008, according to the National Institutes of Health, she was awarded "one of the largest unrestricted educational grants in the history of the psychiatry section." She has also served as an officer for her local chapter of the NAACP.

See also
Cross-cultural psychiatry

References

Further reading
Buckingham, Diane. "Psychopharmacology of Children and Adolescents," in John M. Herrera, William B. Lawson, John J. Sramek (eds.), Cross Cultural Psychiatry, Wiley-Blackwell, 1999, 373–381.
Gaffney, Gary R.; Buckingham, Diane. "Tourette Syndrome and Human Behavior," American Journal of Psychiatry, 150(4), April 1993, 668. 
Sieg, Karl; Buckingham, Diane; et al. "Tc-99m HMPAO SPECT Brain Imaging of Gilles de la Tourette's Syndrome", Clinical Nuclear Medicine, 18(3), March 1993, 255. 

1955 births
African-American physicians
American psychiatrists
American women physicians
Living people
Place of birth missing (living people)
University of Kansas School of Medicine alumni
University of Missouri–Kansas City faculty
American women academics
21st-century African-American people
21st-century African-American women
20th-century African-American people
20th-century African-American women
American women psychiatrists